The bale sling hitch (or strap hitch) is a knot which traditionally uses a continuous loop of strap to form a cow hitch around an object in order to hoist or lower it.  In practice, a similar arrangement can also be formed using a fixed loop at the end of a rope.  This loop could be formed at the end of a line with a knot, such as the bowline, or a large eye splice.

See also
List of knots
List of hitch knots

References

loop knot